The former government of Nikolai Tikhonov was dissolved following the Soviet legislative election of 1984 which gave a clear majority in favour of the Communist Party of the Soviet Union. Tikhonov's government was dissolved in 1985 when Mikhail Gorbachev replaced him with Nikolai Ryzhkov as Premier.

Ministries

Committees

References
General

Government of the Soviet Union > List
 

Specific

Soviet governments
1984 establishments in the Soviet Union
1985 disestablishments
Era of Stagnation